Electronic quantum holography (also known as quantum holographic data storage) is an information storage technology which can encode and read out data at unprecedented density storing as much as 35 bits per electron.

Research 
In 2009, Stanford University's Department of Physics set a new world record for the smallest writing using a scanning tunneling microscope and electron waves to write the initials "SU" at 0.3 nanometers, surpassing the previous record set by IBM in 1989 using xenon atoms. This achievement also set a record for the density of information. Before this technology was invented the density of information had not exceeded one bit per atom. Researchers of electronic quantum holography however were able to push the limit to 35 bits per electron or 20 bits nm−2.

Technology 
A copper chip is placed in a microscope and cleaned. Carbon monoxide molecules are then placed on the surface and moved around. When the electrons in copper interact with the carbon monoxide molecules, they create interference patterns that create an electronic quantum hologram. This hologram can be read like a stack of pages in a book, and can contain multiple images at different wavelengths.

References 

Holographic data storage